Katya Sambuca (born Yekaterina Mikhailova, August 27, 1991) is a Russian singer, actress, television presenter and erotic model. She is married to Bob Jack, a director of adult movies and is a character in his novel Por-no!

Early life and education
Katya was born in St Petersburg. Her father was a construction worker, while her mother was a former gymnast. She has Estonian heritage from her maternal grandmother. At age 15, Katya was used as the model for a girls' doll, "Bobby", manufactured in London. After leaving school she trained as a cook. While working in a St Petersburg restaurant she met Mick Jagger of the Rolling Stones, who told her to swap cooking for modelling and invited her to come to America with him.

Personal life
Katya was given the name "Sambuca" by Bob Jack (real name Sergei Mikhailov), whom she married at the age of 16. The couple has a daughter, Zvana, named after the hotel in Volkhov where Mikhailov lost his virginity.

Career
In 2011 Katya and her husband took her erotic show, which featured her own house and trap music, on tour, and performed in more than 70 cities across Europe. She became one of the most searched entertainers on Russia's search engine Yandex, and appeared on the covers of XXL (Ukraine) and Qoqo (Estonia, the successor to the Estonian edition of Playboy).

In 2013, she became a co-host on the technology show Trendy Device, broadcast on Russia's 2×2 channel.

In August 2014, Sambuca started a family counseling charity in the Estonian town of Haapsalu, where she lives. She offered the President and his wife free marriage counseling after footage emerged of the First Lady in an intimate situation with another man.

Katya is a flautist and has performed as part of a professional orchestra.

Trial with Philipp Plein
In 2014, the German designer Philipp Plein used Katya's nude modelling shots, obtained without permission, in a line of t-shirts, which prompted her to threaten legal action.

Haapsalu statue
In December 2014, the Moscow sculptor Alexander Wroblewski created a bronze statue of the little mermaid using Katya as inspiration. 125 cm tall and weighing 175 kg, Katya donated it to the town of Haapsalu, suggesting that it could boost the tourism industry. The mayor ruled out the proposed location, on the promenade near to Tchaikovsky's memorial, as inappropriate, but added that another place could be found. Katya also wishes to build hotels, shops, and a water park to boost the town's reputation as a resort.

Filmography

Awards
 Most Beautiful Girl of VKontakte (2011)
 Girl of the Year in XXL (2012)
 Girl of the Year in Playboy/Qoqo (2012)
 Special Award of the Barcelona Erotic Show Klic-Klic, FICEB (2013)

References

External links

 
 

Female models from Saint Petersburg
Actresses from Saint Petersburg
Russian television presenters
Living people
1991 births
Russian artists' models
21st-century Russian singers
21st-century Russian women singers
Russian women television presenters
Russian female adult models
Russian pornographic film actresses
Russian people of Estonian descent